Mordellistena mariginiloba is a species of beetle in the family Mordellidae.

References

marginiloba
Beetles described in 1854